Chehalis School District No. 302 is a public school district in Lewis County, Washington, USA and serves the city of Chehalis.  Chehalis is on the I-5 corridor, half way between Seattle, Washington and Portland, Oregon.

In November 2006, the district had an enrollment of 2,596 students.

In May 2015, the district had an enrollment of 2,791 students.

Schools

High schools

 W. F. West High School

Middle Schools

 Chehalis Middle School 

Elementary schools

 James W. Lintott Elementary - Pre-kindergarten to 2nd grade 
 Orin C. Smith Elementary - Third to 5th grade 

The previous primary schools, Cascade (built 1922), R.E. Bennet (opened 1928), and Olympic (built 1960) were replaced by the current elementary schools which were built simultaneously in 2018 and fully opened to all students in 2019.

Special schools and educational programs

 Green Hill Academic School 
 Lewis County Juvenile Detention Center'''
 Turning Point/Lewis County Alternative School

References

School districts in Washington (state)
Education in Lewis County, Washington